Tomorrow, and Tomorrow, and Tomorrow is a 2022 novel by Gabrielle Zevin. Amazon named it the best book of 2022.

Premise 
Over the course of three decades, the relationship between two friends, Sadie Green and Sam Masur, changes as they develop a Japanese-themed game that draws critical attention.

Background 
Zevin has said that some of the fictional video games in the book were inspired by real-life games and events, such as the fictional video game Solution, which was "a take on Train", and the fictional video game Pioneers, which reflected her own feelings about playing Stardew Valley. According to Zevin, she also drew inspiration for her main characters from actual game designers, including Ken Williams, Roberta Williams, John Carmack, and John Romero.

Reception 
The novel was well received by critics, including starred reviews from Kirkus Reviews and Publishers Weekly. Kirkus said the novel is "[s]ure to enchant even those who have never played a video game in their lives". Publishers Weekly called the novel "a one-of-a-kind achievement". In a review for The Washington Post, Ron Charles wrote favorably of the book's moral complexity, and related its Shakespearean title to the generative possibilities inherent in gameplay. 

Wired called the novel "utterly absorbing", and The New York Times Book Review referred to it as "delightful and absorbing" and "expansive and entertaining". Paste recommended readers listen to the audiobook to better navigate "the complex, perspective-shifting format". NPR's Maureen Corrigan praised the "big, beautifully written" book for placing a non-romantic relationship at its center, and for taking on the issue of cultural appropriation.

Tomorrow, and Tomorrow, and Tomorrow was a New York Times Best Seller, being listed on its 2022 Notable Books List, and an IndieBound best seller. In July 2022, it was a book club pick for Amerie and Barnes & Noble, as well as an Apple Books best seller for Fiction and Literature. It continued to be an Apple Books best seller in August and was also a Belletrist Book Club pick. Amazon named the novel the best book of 2022. Indigo and Kirkus also included Tomorrow in their lists of the best books of the year.

Adaptation 
In 2021, Paramount Pictures and Temple Hill Entertainment purchased the film rights for Tomorrow, and Tomorrow, and Tomorrow for $2 million. The film will be produced by Marty Bowen, Wyck Godfrey, and Isaac Klausner, with Zevin writing the script.

References 

2022 American novels
2022 in literature
Novels set in Massachusetts
Novels set in California
Alfred A. Knopf books
Novels set in the 1990s